Deh-e Meydan (also Romanized as Deh-e Meydān, Deh Maidan, and Deh Meydān) is a village in Band-e Amir Rural District, Zarqan District, Shiraz County, Fars Province, Iran. At the 2006 census, its population was 28, in 6 families.

References 

Populated places in Zarqan County